Frank Mozzicato (born June 19, 2003) is an American professional baseball pitcher in the Kansas City Royals organization.

Amateur career
Mozzicato attended East Catholic High School in Manchester, Connecticut, and pitched for the school's baseball team. He committed to attend the University of Connecticut on a college baseball scholarship with the Connecticut Huskies baseball team.
In his senior year of high school, Mozzicato’s draft stock rose significantly after he threw four consecutive no-hitters. That year, he led his team to a Connecticut Class M State Championship, in which he struck out 17 and only allowed one hit. As a senior, Mozzicato recorded a 0.16 earned run average with 135 strike outs over 55.2 innings.

Professional career
Mozzicato was selected by Kansas City Royals in the first round with the seventh overall selection of the 2021 Major League Baseball draft. He signed with the Royals on July 17, 2021, receiving a $3.55 million signing bonus. He opened the 2022 season in extended spring training. In mid-May, he was assigned to the Columbia Fireflies of the Single-A Carolina League.

Personal life
Mozzicato's brother, Anthony, also pitched for East Catholic High School's baseball team.  Anthony currently pitches for the Central Connecticut Blue Devils baseball team.

References

External links

Living people
Baseball pitchers
2003 births
Baseball players from Hartford, Connecticut
Columbia Fireflies players